William Albert "Shorty" Schilletter (December 25, 1893 – September 14, 1974) was a college football player and lieutenant.

Early years
William was the son of Augustus "Shorty" Schilletter, a German immigrant in charge of the Clemson College dining hall.

College football
Schilletter was an All-Southern tackle for the Clemson Tigers of Clemson University, captain of the 1914 team. He was a charter member of the Clemson Athletic Hall of Fame inducted in 1973.

Military
Following his playing career, he went into the military.

References

1893 births
1974 deaths
All-Southern college football players
American people of German descent
Clemson Tigers football players
Players of American football from South Carolina
People from Anderson, South Carolina
American football tackles
American football guards